The 2007–08 season was the 109th season of competitive league football in the history of English football club Wolverhampton Wanderers. They played the season in the 2nd tier of the English Football system, the Football League Championship. The season saw them finish seventh, narrowly missing out on a play-off place only by virtue of goal difference.

This season was the first under the ownership of Steve Morgan, ending the seventeen-year reign of Sir Jack Hayward. Morgan had bought the club for the nominal sum of £10, with the proviso that he invested £30 million into the club.

Season review
The close season saw businessman Steve Morgan take control of the club for a nominal £10 fee in return for a £30 million investment into the club, resulting in the departure of Sir Jack Hayward after 17 years as chairman. The protracted takeover, originally announced in May, was finally completed on 9 August 2007. The announcement of the deal saw the club set out their future ethos:

After last season's unexpected play-off finish, hopes were high for the club to go one step further this time, with manager stating automatic promotion was his aim. The side was strengthened by signing Freddy Eastwood, Stephen Elliott and Michael Gray, but last season's Player of the Year, goalkeeper Matt Murray - who had only just recovered from a broken shoulder - missed the whole campaign after suffering a knee injury in pre-season training.

On the field, the team started the season inconsistently, but a strong October and November saw them push as high as third, just three points from the summit. However, an injury suffered by key player Michael Kightly seemed to severely weaken the team's creativity and preceded a dismal Christmas period that saw them pick up just 4 points from a possible 21, leaving them mid-table and without hopes of an automatic finish.

More players were brought in during the January transfer window, most crucially striker Sylvan Ebanks-Blake from Plymouth Argyle, who scored 12 goals in the remainder of the season, finishing the division's top scorer on 23 goals. However, his goals alone could not bring about a second successive play-off finish as the side finished outside the final spot on goal difference, two goals short of Watford. Despite suffering just two defeats in their final 15 games, several crucial late goals that were conceded in the second half of the season ultimately proved costly. Indeed, just two more goals on the final day of the season would have booked them a playoff place.

Results

Pre season

"Wolves XI" pre season results: 0–0 v Brighton & Hove Albion (26 July; home), 7–0 v Holyhead Hotspur (28 July; away)

Football League Championship

A total of 24 teams competed in the Championship in the 2007–08 season. Each team would play every other team twice, once at their stadium, and once at the opposition's. Three points were awarded to teams for each win, one point per draw, and none for defeats. The provisional fixture list was released on 14 June 2007, but was subject to change in the event of matches being selected for television coverage.

Final table

Results summary

Source: Statto.com

Results by round

FA Cup

League Cup

Players

Statistics

|-
|align="left"|||align="left"|||align="left"|  
|0||0||0||0||0||0||0||0||0||0||
|-
|align="left"|||align="left"|||align="left"| 
|30||0||2||0||0||0||style="background:#98FB98"|32||0||1||0||
|-
|align="left"|||align="left"|||align="left"| 
|||||2||1||1||0||||||5||0||
|-
|align="left"|||align="left"|||align="left"| 
|||||1||0||0||0||||||8||0||
|-
|align="left"|||align="left"|||align="left"|  (c)
|||0||1||0||0||0||||0||3||0||
|-
|align="left"|||align="left"|||align="left"|  ¤
|||||1||0||1||1||||||2||0||
|-
|align="left"|||align="left"|||align="left"| 
|||||||1||||0||||||1||0||
|-
|align="left"|||align="left"|||align="left"| 
|||||2||0||2||0||||||8||0||
|-
|align="left"|||align="left"|FW||align="left"| 
|||||3||2||2||1||||11||2||0||
|-
|align="left"|10||align="left"|FW||align="left"|  ¤
|||||3||1||0||0||||||3||0||
|-
|align="left"|11||align="left"|||align="left"| 
|||0||1||0||||0||||0||3||0||
|-
|align="left"|12||align="left"|||align="left"|  
|||||||0||2||0||||||3||0||
|-
|align="left"|14||align="left"|||align="left"| 
|||0||3||0||||0||||0||3||0||
|-
|align="left"|15||align="left"|||align="left"|  ¤
|||0||0||0||0||0||||0||0||0||
|-
|align="left"|16||align="left"|||align="left"| 
|0||0||0||0||0||0||0||0||0||0||
|-
|align="left"|17||align="left"|||align="left"| 
|||||2||0||0||0||style="background:#98FB98"|||||0||0||
|-
|align="left"|18||align="left"|||align="left"|  ¤ 
|0||0||0||0||1||0||||0||0||0||
|-
|align="left"|19||align="left"|FW||align="left"| 
|||||||1||0||0||style="background:#98FB98"|||||0||0||
|-
|align="left"|20||align="left"|||align="left"|  ¤ 
|0||0||0||0||2||0||||0||0||0||
|-
|align="left"|21||align="left"|||align="left"|  ¤
|||0||0||0||0||0||||0||0||0||
|-
|align="left"|22||align="left"|||align="left"|  
|0||0||0||0||0||0||0||0||0||0||
|-
|align="left"|23||align="left"|FW||align="left"| 
|||||||0||2||1||style="background:#98FB98"|||||1||0||
|-
|align="left"|24||align="left"|||style="background:#faecc8" align="left"|  
|||||||0||0||0||||||5||0||
|-
|align="left"|25||align="left"|||style="background:#faecc8" align="left"|  
|||0||0||0||2||0||||0||0||0||
|-
|align="left"|26||align="left"|||align="left"|  
|10||||0||0||0||0||style="background:#98FB98"|10||||0||0||
|-
|align="left"|27||align="left"|FW||align="left"| 
|20||12||0||0||0||0||style="background:#98FB98"|20||12||2||0||
|-
|align="left"|28||align="left"|||align="left"|  ¤ †
|0||0||0||0||||0||||0||0||0||
|-
|align="left"|29||align="left"|||align="left"|  
|0||0||0||0||0||0||0||0||0||0||
|-
|align="left"|30||align="left"|||align="left"| 
|0||0||0||0||0||0||0||0||0||0||
|-
|align="left"|31||align="left"|||align="left"| 
|46||0||3||0||0||0||49||0||0||0||
|-
|align="left"|32||align="left"|||align="left"| 
|||||3||0||2||0||style="background:#98FB98"|||||1||0||
|-
|align="left"|33||align="left"|||align="left"| 
|||||||0||1||0||style="background:#98FB98"|||||3||0||
|-
|align="left"|34||align="left"|||align="left"|  † 
|0||0||0||0||0||0||0||0||0||0||
|-
|align="left"|34||align="left"|FW||style="background:#faecc8" align="left"| 
|||||1||0||0||0||||||0||0||
|-
|align="left"|35||align="left"|||align="left"|  ¤
|0||0||0||0||2||0||||0||0||0||
|-
|align="left"|36||align="left"|||align="left"|  ¤
|0||0||0||0||0||0||0||0||0||0||
|-
|align="left"|37||align="left"|FW||align="left"|  ¤
|0||0||0||0||0||0||0||0||0||0||
|-
|align="left"|38||align="left"|||align="left"|  ¤
|0||0||0||0||0||0||0||0||0||0||
|-
|align="left"|39||align="left"|||align="left"| 
|0||0||0||0||||0||||0||0||0||
|-
|align="left"|40||align="left"|||align="left"| 
|15||0||0||0||0||0||style="background:#98FB98"|15||0||3||0||
|-
|align="left"|41||align="left"|||align="left"|  ¤ 
|0||0||0||0||0||0||0||0||0||0||
|}

Awards

Transfers

In

Out

Loans in

Loans out

Kit
The season saw a new away kit, navy blue with an old gold and white trim. The home kit remained the same as the previous campaign and that season's white away kit was retained as a third kit for this term. The kits were manufactured by Le Coq Sportif, Chaucer Consulting sponsored the club for a fourth season.

References

2007-08
2007–08 Football League Championship by team